Sara Maria Evelina Nordenstam (born 28 February 1983 in Lycksele, Sweden) is a Norwegian swimmer. Nordenstam was born to Swedish parents and lived in Sweden until she was 10, before moving to Oslo. Since 2004 she has been a naturalised citizen of Norway.

Nordenstam set a European record in the heats of the 200 meters breaststroke at the 2008 Summer Olympics in Beijing. In the final she took the bronze medal with a new European record of 2:23,02, making her the first Norwegian woman to win an Olympic swimming medal.

Nordenstam has 16 Norwegian championship medals.

Nordenstam studied advertising and marketing in the United States and received a bachelor's degree. Nordenstam is a resident of Lambertseter in Oslo.

See also
List of Norwegian records in swimming

References

External links

Living people
Swedish emigrants to Norway
Norwegian female breaststroke swimmers
Olympic bronze medalists for Norway
Olympic swimmers of Norway
Swimmers at the 2008 Summer Olympics
Swimmers at the 2012 Summer Olympics
1983 births
Olympic bronze medalists in swimming
European Aquatics Championships medalists in swimming
Medalists at the 2008 Summer Olympics